The Malay Heritage Centre (Jawi: تامن واريثن ملايو) is a cultural centre and museum located at Sultan Gate off Beach Road in Kampong Glam, Singapore. It showcases the culture, heritage and history of Malay Singaporeans.

History

The building was once the Istana Kampong Glam, and was part of a larger original compound that led to the Beach Road frontage. Sultan Gate has been known as such since the 1950s. The Malay Heritage Foundation
On the grounds of the Malay Heritage Centre are Gelam trees, a replica of a Bugis prahu boat, the Pinisi, and information markers on the history of the Bugis people and their trade. The centre itself preserves and showcases Malay culture and heritage in Singapore through historic artefacts, multimedia and diorama displays, and exhibits.

The centre also organizes Malay cultural programmes and workshops. Before 2008 these, together with other fund-raising activities, contributed two-thirds of the centre's operational costs. In 2008, the Government of Singapore announced that it would provide full funding of S$1.7 million a year to the centre, instead of just the one-third funding provided in previous years. The funding, and additional aid from the National Heritage Board, is expected to give the centre a boost to become a museum of international standard, and create opportunities for it to work with other top regional museums in Indonesia and Malaysia.

In August 2011, the Malay Heritage Centre was closed for extensive renovations. It reopened on 1 September 2012.

Gallery

See also
 Demographics of Singapore
 Jalan Kubor Cemetery

References

External links

Malay Heritage Centre on the YourSingapore website

2004 establishments in Singapore
Ethnic museums in Singapore
Folk museums in Singapore
Museums established in 2004
Rochor